HMS Fancy (J308) was a turbine engine-powered  during the Second World War. She survived the war and was sold to Belgium in 1951 as A.F. Dufour (M903).

Design and description

The ships' complement consisted of 85 officers and ratings.

The reciprocating ships had two vertical triple-expansion steam engines, each driving one shaft, using steam provided by two Admiralty three-drum boilers.

The Algerine class was armed with a QF  Mk V anti-aircraft gun and four twin-gun mounts for Oerlikon 20 mm cannon. The latter guns were in short supply when the first ships were being completed and they often got a proportion of single mounts. By 1944, single-barrel Bofors 40 mm mounts began replacing the twin 20 mm mounts on a one for one basis. All of the ships were fitted for four throwers and two rails for depth charges.

Construction and career

Service in the Royal Navy 
The ship was ordered on 25 June 1941 at the Blyth Shipbuilding Company at Blyth, England. She was laid down on 22 July 1941 and launched on 20 April 1943. She was commissioned on 21 November 1943. She joined the 6th Minesweeper Flotilla.

In March 1944, she conducted her first minesweeping operation off Yarmouth. Then in May, she sweeper the south coast in preparation of the upcoming Invasion of Normandy code named D-Day. Moreover, in June, she cleared ten channels for the invasion force to safely cross.

In April 1945, she was sent to sweep the Adriatic, clearing Venice and Trieste at the same time.

The ship supervised German minesweepers as they swept the waters off Norway in July 1946.

Fancy was decommissioned in December 1947.

She was then sold to Belgium in 1952. The ship underwent refit from June 1952 and February 1953.

Service in the Belgian Navy 
Fancy was renamed A.F. Dufour and was commissioned on 9 August 1951.

On 30 March 1956, the ship left to patrol the waters off Belgium for 3 weeks.

She left Ostend on 2 August 1957 for the Belgian Congo to serve in the training of Congolese personnel at the Banane Naval base, Banana District. She made a stopover in Las Palmas (Canary Island) from August 9 to 10, then in Freetown (Sierra Leone) from August 16 to 18, in Ango-Ango (Angola) on the 26th and in Banana on the 27th. On 3 September, she was renamed N'Zadi.

In 1960, the Belgian Navy left Congo and also leaving behind N'Zadi behind.

The ship still remained at the same position where she was abandoned by the Belgian Navy and is now capsized at the pier.

References

Bibliography
 
 
 Peter Elliott (1977) Allied Escort Ships of World War II. MacDonald & Janes,

External links
 

 

Algerine-class minesweepers of the Royal Navy
1943 ships
World War II minesweepers of the United Kingdom
Algerine-class minesweepers of the Belgian Navy
Ships built on the River Blyth